was the third bishop of the Japan Methodist Church.  He was elected to this office in 1920.  He was born in Central Japan.  He was converted to Christ at the age of seventeen.  He became a Methodist, joining the Japan Conference of the Methodist Episcopal Church, South.  He served as a pastor, an educator and an editor.  He was a delegate to the Fifth Ecumenical Conference, London, England, 1921.  He was a delegate also to the Council of Religions in Tokyo.  He died April 3, 1930, on a train after having been stricken with apoplexy.

Japanese Methodist bishops
Converts to Methodism
Japanese clergy
Japanese editors
Japanese educators
1870 births
1930 deaths
Southern Methodists